The LG-VX8360 was the replacement for the LG VX8350. The phones are almost identical. It was marketed as a multimedia phone with an external music player and a 1.3-megapixel camera.

External links
http://www.lge.com/us/mobile-phones/LG-VX8360.jsp
http://reviews.cnet.com/cell-phones/lg-vx8360-verizon-wireless/4505-6454_7-33490611.html
http://www.phonearena.com/htmls/LG-VX8360-phone-p_2966.html

VX8360